Heartaches by the Number is an album released in 2007 by American country music artist David Ball. It is his first release for the Shanachie Records label. Except for the track "Please Feed the Jukebox", which Ball wrote himself, all of the songs on this album are covers of classic country songs. No singles were released from this album.

Track listing

Personnel
 David Ball - lead vocals
 Brad Clancey - drums
 Perry Coleman - background vocals
 Steve Gibson - electric guitar
 Owen Hale - drums
 Mike Johnson - steel guitar
 Chris Leuzinger - electric guitar
 Larry Paxton - bass guitar
 Joe Spivey - fiddle, acoustic guitar
 Tommy White - steel guitar

References

2007 albums
David Ball (country singer) albums
Shanachie Records albums
Covers albums